Black: The Birth of Evil is a novel written by author Ted Dekker. It is the first book in the Circle Series, and is a part of the Books of History Chronicles.

The book was published in 2009 by Thomas Nelson.

Plot
This book is about a man named Thomas Hunter in Denver, Colorado, 2010, who, after being knocked unconscious from a bullet wound to the head, wakes up to find himself in a strange world full of black, twisted trees. After being attacked by evil bats called Shataiki and led out of the Black Forest by a white bat, he is rendered unconscious again due to blood loss. He wakes up to find himself back in Denver.

Startled at the sudden change, he can’t figure out which world is real. He soon discovers that every time he falls asleep, he wakes up in the other world, until he falls asleep there.

Outside of the Black Forest is the Colored Forest, a paradise inhabited by a civilization of immortal-yet innocent-human beings who are watched over by Elyon, a God-like being, along with white, bat-like Roush, who are opposites of the Shataiki and act as servants of Elyon.

Thomas eventually finds out that this other world is our own thousands of years in the future, and that a virus, mutated from the Raison vaccine, would wipe out his present-day Earth later that year.

Thomas is forced to fight evil in both worlds, a difficult prospect, for while evil is portrayed differently in each reality, it is equally as potent, and Thomas quickly finds that putting a stop to an event of apocalyptic proportions is no easy task.

Characters
 Thomas Hunter: a 25-year-old man living in Denver, Colorado. He travels between Other Earth and his Earth through his dreams. Also known as the Histories. He has to find answers in Other Earth in order to save Earth before a deadly virus is spread that will destroy humanity.
 Kara Hunter: Sister of Thomas who helps him travel the world to stop the spread of the Raison strain.
 Michal: One of the Roush that Thomas encounters on Other Earth who tells him information he needs to help Earth.
 Gabil: The Roush who helps him escape the Black Forest from the evil Shataiki.
 Rachelle: Uses healing water to cure Thomas when he escapes from the Black Forest. She instantly falls in love with Thomas and claims him as hers.
 Tanis: The first human of Other Earth and leader of the Colored Forest who wants to eradicate the Shataiki from the Black Forest. When he goes to fight the Shataiki, he is tempted by Teeleh.
 Elyon: Creator of Other Earth.
 Teeleh: Leader of the Shataiki who tries to convince Thomas to drink the forbidden water.
 Carlos Missirian: Assassin who is hired to kill Thomas Hunter on Earth.
 Valborg Svensson: Multi-billionaire who discovers how to make the Raison vaccine into a deadly virus.
 Monique de Raison: Creator of the Raison vaccine. She is kidnapped by Thomas so he can convince her what Svensson plans to do to her vaccine. After Thomas convinces her, she tries to find a cure for what she has created.
 Jacques de Raison: Founder of Raison Pharmaceutical. Father of Monique.

References

External links
Black on Ted Dekker's Official Website

2004 American novels
2004 science fiction novels
Novels by Ted Dekker
American Christian novels
American thriller novels
Thomas Nelson (publisher) books